The 1972 Maureen Connolly Brinker International was a women's tennis tournament played on indoor carpet courts at the T-BAR-M Racquet Club in Dallas, Texas that was part of the 1972 WT Pro Tour. It was the inaugural edition of the tournament, held from March 7 through March 12, 1972. Unseeded Nancy Gunter won the singles title and earned $11,000 first-prize money.

Finals

Singles
 Nancy Gunter defeated  Billie Jean King 7–6(5–2), 6–1

Doubles
 Rosemary Casals /  Billie Jean King defeated  Judy Tegart /  Françoise Dürr 6–3, 4–6, 7–5

Prize money

References

External links
 Women's Tennis Association (WTA) tournament details

Virginia Slims of Dallas
Virginia Slims of Dallas
Maureen Connolly Brinker International
Maureen Connolly Brinker International
Maureen
Maureen Connolly Brinker International